Terry Palmer (born 26 November 1972 in Dublin) is an Irish retired soccer player who played in the League of Ireland during the 1990s and 2000s.

He made his League of Ireland debut for University College Dublin A.F.C. on 27 January 1991and played for the club for seven seasons. He scored a dream goal in the final of the Leinster Senior Cup (association football) in February 1995.

He then transferred to Shamrock Rovers in 1998. He was the clubs Player of the Year in the 1999–2000 season. He made a total of 4 appearances in Europe for the Hoops in the 2003 UEFA Intertoto Cup, before being released in 2004. For the 2000-01 League of Ireland and 2001-02 League of Ireland seasons Palmer was ever present.

He spent his final season in League of Ireland football at Bohemians making his debut at the Waterford Regional Sports Centre on 8 April. He retired at the end of the 2005 League of Ireland season.

Always a Rovers fan Palmer can be seen these days at most games.

Honours
League of Ireland First Division
 UCD 1994/95
League of Ireland First Division Shield
 UCD 1994/95
Leinster Senior Cup (football): 2
 UCD 1994/95, 1995/96
SRFC Player of the Year:
 Shamrock Rovers - 1999/2000

References

Republic of Ireland association footballers
Association football defenders
League of Ireland players
University College Dublin A.F.C. players
Shamrock Rovers F.C. players
Bohemian F.C. players
1972 births
Living people
Stella Maris F.C. players